Emilio Bottecchia (born 24 December 1933) is an Italian racing cyclist. He rode in the 1958 Tour de France.

References

External links
 

1933 births
Living people
Italian male cyclists
Place of birth missing (living people)
Cyclists from the Province of Verona